A growing self-organizing map (GSOM) is a growing variant of a self-organizing map (SOM). The GSOM was developed to address the issue of identifying a suitable map size in the SOM. It starts with a minimal number of nodes (usually 4) and grows new nodes on the boundary based on a heuristic. By using the value called Spread Factor (SF), the data analyst has the ability to control the growth of the GSOM.

All the starting nodes of the GSOM are boundary nodes, i.e. each node has the freedom to grow in its own direction at the beginning. (Fig. 1) New Nodes are grown from the boundary nodes. Once a node is selected for growing all its free neighboring positions will be grown new nodes. The figure shows the three possible node growth options for a rectangular GSOM.

The algorithm
The GSOM process is as follows:
Initialization phase:
Initialize the weight vectors of the starting nodes (usually four) with random numbers between 0 and 1.
Calculate the growth threshold for the given data set of dimension  according to the spread factor using the formula 
Growing Phase:
Present input to the network.
Determine the weight vector that is closest to the input vector mapped to the current feature map (winner), using Euclidean distance (similar to the SOM).
The weight vector adaptation is applied only to the neighborhood of the winner and the winner itself. The neighborhood is a set of neurons around the winner, but in the GSOM the starting neighborhood selected for weight adaptation is smaller compared to the SOM (localized weight adaptation). The amount of adaptation (learning rate) is also reduced exponentially over the iterations. Even within the neighborhood, weights that are closer to the winner are adapted more than those further away.
Increase the error value of the winner (error value is the difference between the input vector and the weight vectors).
Grow nodes if i is a boundary node. Distribute weights to neighbors if  is a non-boundary node.
Initialize the new node weight vectors to match the neighboring node weights.
Initialize the learning rate to its starting value.
Repeat steps 2 – 7 until all inputs have been presented and node growth is reduced to a minimum level.
Smoothing phase.
Reduce learning rate and fix a small starting neighborhood.
Find winner and adapt the weights of the winner and neighbors in the same way as in growing phase.

Applications 

The GSOM can be used for many preprocessing tasks in Data mining, for Nonlinear dimensionality reduction, for approximation of principal curves and manifolds, for clustering and classification. It gives often the better representation of the data geometry than the SOM (see the classical benchmark for principal curves on the left).

References

Bibliography 
 
 
 Alahakoon, D., Halgamuge, S. K. and Sirinivasan, B. (2000) Dynamic Self Organizing Maps With Controlled Growth for Knowledge Discovery, IEEE Transactions on Neural Networks, Special Issue on Knowledge Discovery and Data Mining, 11, pp 601–614.
 Alahakoon, D., Halgamuge, S. K. and Sirinivasan, B. (1998) A Structure Adapting Feature Map for Optimal Cluster Representation  in Proceedings of the 5th International Conference on Neural Information Processing (ICONIP 98), Kitakyushu, Japan, pp 809–812
 Alahakoon, D., Halgamuge, S. K. and Sirinivasan, B. (1998) A Self Growing Cluster Development Approach to Data Mining  in Proceedings of IEEE International Conference on Systems, Man and Cybernetics, San Diego, USA, pp 2901–2906
 Alahakoon, D. and Halgamuge, S. K. (1998) Knowledge Discovery with Supervised and Unsupervised Self Evolving Neural Networks  in Proceedings of 5th International Conference on Soft Computing and Information/Intelligent Systems, Fukuoka, Japan, pp 907–910

See also
 Self-organizing map
Time Adaptive Self-Organizing Map
 Elastic map
 Artificial intelligence
 Machine learning
 Data mining
 Nonlinear dimensionality reduction

Machine learning algorithms
Artificial neural networks